Basilone may refer to:

People
Basil (name), a name of which "Basilone" is a variant
John Basilone (1916–1945), an American soldier and U.S. Marine, recipient of the Medal of Honor

Ships

, a United States Navy Gearing-class destroyer in commission from 1949 to 1977
, a United States Navy Arleigh Burke-class guided-missile destroyer